M47 or M-47 may refer to:

 M47 bomb, an American chemical/incendiary weapon
 47th known Mersenne prime
 M47 Dragon, an American anti-tank missile system
 M-47 (Michigan highway), a state highway in Michigan
 M47 (Cape Town), a Metropolitan Route in Cape Town, South Africa
 M47 (Johannesburg), a Metropolitan Route in Johannesburg, South Africa
 M47 Patton, an American main battle tank
 BMW M47, diesel engine (1998–2007)
 Messier 47, an open star cluster in the constellation Puppis
 Madsen M47, a Danish rifle

See also
 47 (disambiguation)